The Harenna shrew (Crocidura harenna) is a white-toothed shrew found only in one location in the Bale Mountains in southern Ethiopia. It occurs within an area of less than ten square kilometres, and is listed as a critically endangered species, due to habitat loss and a restricted range.

References

Crocidura
Endemic fauna of Ethiopia
Mammals of Ethiopia
Bale Mountains
Fauna of the Ethiopian Highlands
Critically endangered fauna of Africa
Mammals described in 1990